South Africa have played at 7 of the 9 Rugby World Cup tournaments, having been unable to compete in the first two tournaments due to a sports boycott during the apartheid era. Following the end of apartheid, they hosted the 1995 Rugby World Cup and won the tournament, they were champions again at the 2007 tournament in France. The Springboks then made history when they beat England in the Rugby World Cup 2019 in Japan despite losing a pool stage match. 

The Springboks are tied with the New Zealand All Blacks for tournament wins at the Rugby World Cup - both teams having won 3 times - although they have participated in fewer tournaments. In addition to this, they are the only rugby team to have won every World Cup final they have played in.

By position

By matches

1995

Pool A

Quarter-final

Semi-final

Final

1999

Pool A

Quarter-final

Semi-final

Third place play-off

2003

Pool C

Quarter-final

2007

Pool A

Quarter-final

Semi-final

Final

2011

Pool D

Quarter-Final

2015

Pool B

Quarter-final

Semi-final

Bronze final

2019

Pool B

Quarter-final

Semi final 

Final

Overall record
Overall record against all nations in the World Cup:

References

 Davies, Gerald (2004) The History of the Rugby World Cup, Sanctuary Publishing Ltd,
 Farr-Jones, Nick, (2003). Story of the Rugby World Cup, Australian Post Corporation,

 
World Cup
Rugby World Cup by nation